Yoro FC is a Honduran football club based in Yoro, Yoro, Honduras.

History
They were relegated to Liga Mayor for the 2008/2009 season. Later, they participated in the 2012–13 season finishing twice in semifinals only to lose to Juticalpa on both occasions.

Achievements
Liga de Ascenso
Runners-up (3): 2010–11 A, 2012–13 C, 2016–17 A

Yoro Championship
Winners (1): 1962

Football clubs in Honduras